Willi (Willy) Lehmann (15 March 1884, in Leipzig – 13 December 1942, in Berlin) was a police official and Soviet agent in Nazi Germany.

Lehmann was a criminal inspector and SS-Hauptsturmführer (captain), alias Agent A-201/Breitenbach. During World War II Lehmann was one of the most valuable sources for the NKVD in Germany.

Biography
Lehmann joined the Berlin Police force in 1911. In 1920 he became deputy division chief of anti-espionage. In 1929 Lehmann began providing information for the NKVD. He did this not out of communist sympathy, but because he was married, also had a girlfriend, and needed money. In addition, he had a fondness for betting on horses.

In 1933 Lehmann joined the Gestapo. The NKVD code name for the Gestapo was Apotheke (pharmacy). In the Gestapo, Lehmann became director of the division combating Soviet espionage. Thanks to Lehmann's information, the Soviets were able to free their agent Arnold Deutsch, who later recruited Kim Philby.

Lehmann joined the SS in 1934. Toward the end of June, Hermann Göring asked Lehmann to help organize the Röhm Putsch to liquidate opponents of the regime. Lehmann later told the NKVD that the murders he committed during the Night of the Long Knives sickened him. But at the same time they solidified his position with his Gestapo superiors.

In 1939 Lehmann transferred to the Reich Security Main Office (RSHA), division IV. His responsibility was to prevent the Soviets from spying on the German armaments industry. This position enabled Lehmann to provide valuable information to the Soviets about German armaments. On 19 June 1941, Lehmann reported to the NKVD the exact date on which the Germans planned to invade the Soviet Union. Operation Barbarossa was launched on 22 June 1941. His message was telegraphed to Beria and Stalin, but the latter dismissed it, like other such reports. That was his last contact, because soon after the invasion all his Soviet contacts left, and all the reserve radios German agents had insufficient range after the capture of Minsk on June 28th.

In 1942, with the Germans' discovery of the Red Orchestra, Lehmann was arrested and shot without trial on orders of Heinrich Himmler, who at the same time had the entire matter hushed up.

References

Bibliography

 
 

1884 births
1942 deaths
German spies for the Soviet Union
World War II spies for the Soviet Union
Executed spies
Gestapo personnel
Military personnel from Leipzig
Red Orchestra (espionage)
People executed for treason against Germany
Executed German people
People executed by Nazi Germany by firearm
People from Saxony executed by Nazi Germany
Politicide perpetrators
People from the Kingdom of Saxony
Reich Security Main Office personnel
SS-Hauptsturmführer
Police of Nazi Germany